Stari Grad v Podbočju is a settlement south of Podbočje in the Municipality of Krško in eastern Slovenia. The area is part of the traditional region of Lower Carniola and is now included with the rest of the municipality in the Lower Sava Statistical Region.

Name
The name of the settlement was changed from Stari Grad to Stari Grad v Podbočju in 1953. In the past it was known as Oedenschloß in German.

Cultural heritage
The site of a 13th-century medieval castle in the settlement was excavated and shown to have been occupied from the Early Iron Age with Hallstatt period and La Tène period occupation levels. Roman artefacts were also found. By 1581 the site of the castle is known from written sources to have been abandoned.

References

External links
Stari Grad v Podbočju on Geopedia

Populated places in the Municipality of Krško